The Pasadena Police Department is the police department serving Pasadena, California. The headquarters of the Pasadena Police Department is located at 207 North Garfield Avenue in Pasadena, just a block from the Pasadena City Hall and Paseo Colorado. The department employs 241 sworn officers, 13 reserve officers, and 126 civilian employees. Police chief John Perez, who spent his entire career with the department, retired and was replaced by former PPD Commander, now interim Chief Jason Clawson.  The city has selected former San Gabriel, CA PPD Chief Eugene Harris to take the position in January 2023.

Overview

The Pasadena Police Department was founded in 1886. The department was one of the first police departments to have female police officers. In 2006, Commander Marilyn Diaz left PPD to become the police chief for Sierra Madre, California, becoming Los Angeles County's first female municipal police chief.

In 2004, the Pasadena Unified School District dismantled the Pasadena Unified School District Police Department, amidst budget cuts. As a result, the Pasadena Police Department took over police services for the Pasadena Unified School District and PPD's division on PUSD schools is known as the Safe Schools Team, which is made of eight sworn members—one sergeant and seven officers.

Currently the department patrols some notable events, such as the Rose Bowl and the Tournament of Roses Parade, which works jointly with the Los Angeles County Sheriff's Department.

The department usually steps up patrols by adding officers in areas of recent homicides. This is known as Operation Safe City.

The department utilizes primarily the Orange County Sheriff's Academy in Tustin for academy training. PPD also utilizes the Rio Hondo Regional Police Academy in Whittier.

Since the establishment of the Pasadena Police Department, three officers have died in the line of duty.

Tasers

PPD has been using Tasers since mid-June 2004.

Three years after the deployment of Tasers, 36-year-old Richard Baisner of Arcadia died after being Tasered once by a Pasadena Police Officer. Baisner was Tasered after resisting arrest against PPD officers. After using "soft restraints" on him while on a gurney, Baisner stopped breathing. An autopsy determined Baisner died from "effects of cocaine intoxication," with other significant factors of hypertrophic heart disease and coronary atherosclerosis.

Air support

The department began air operations in 1969 and was one of the first members of the Airborne Law Enforcement Association.

In 1999, the department expanded its operations by creating the Foothill Air Support Team (FAST), working with ten nearby police departments by providing air support to cities that could not afford their own helicopter. Besides Pasadena, cities participating in FAST are Alhambra, Arcadia, Covina, Monrovia, Glendora, San Marino, South Pasadena, Sierra Madre, Pomona, and Irwindale. Three police officers are chosen from the participating FAST cities to work as Tactical Flight Officers, whose duties include observing, monitoring radio frequency for all participating cities, navigating, and coordinating ground units.

Pasadena PD also operates and stores a Eurocopter AS350 Écureuil owned by the Los Angeles Interagency Metropolitan Police Apprehension Crime Task Force (L.A. IMPACT). A pilot and Tactical Flight Officer are assigned full-time to L.A. IMPACT to assist narcotics detectives with high altitude surveillance operations.

The department maintains five of their own helicopters, based at an area near Jet Propulsion Laboratory and the Rose Bowl.

Using a strategy developed by Lieutenant Mike Ingram, Pasadena PD Air Support and the San Gabriel Valley Mosquito and Vector Control District use Pasadena PD helicopters to check swimming pools in 23 cities to ensure cleanliness and to prevent the West Nile virus.

On 17 November 2012, a police helicopter struck another on the ground at the department's heliport, injuring five people. Both aircraft suffered considerable damage.

Fleet

 MD 500 - 1
 Bell 206 BIII - 1
 Bell OH-58 Kiowa Warrior - 3

Controversies and incidents 
Over the years, the Pasadena Police Department has been connected to several incidents involving possible excessive force and racial profiling:

Death of Leroy Barnes Jr. 
On February 19, 2009, Leroy Barnes Jr, a 38-year-old Black man, was shot and killed by two Pasadena police officers at a traffic stop. Although early official statements issued by the Pasadena police department were conflicting, the shooting occurred inside a car during a struggle over a gun. Police department officials stated that the officers fired at Barnes after pointing a handgun at them. Although the Pasadena Police Officers Association obtained an injunction in court to prevent the initial release of the identities of the two officers involved, the officers were later identified as Glen Reep and Michael Alvarado in papers filed in federal court.

Death of Kendrec McDade 
On the evening of March 24, 2012, a 19-year-old Black man named Kendrec McDade was fatally shot by two white Pasadena police officers in northwest Pasadena. The officers, Matthew Griffin and Jeffery Newlen, were responding to a 911 emergency caller who claimed that he had been robbed at gunpoint by two armed men. The 911 caller, Oscar Carrillo-Gonzalez, later admitted to lying about seeing a weapon in order to get a more urgent police response, and served 90 days in jail for the false report. Although McDade was unarmed and not involved in the theft, he was mistaken as a suspect when he was spotted on the same street that the robbery occurred. According to police reports, when the officers began their chase, McDade ran away, and the officers continued their pursuit both on foot and in their patrol car. At some point during the pursuit, McDade turned and ran back towards the patrol car. Griffin, in the driver's seat of the car and believing that McDade was reaching for a gun, shot at McDade four times at close range. Upon hearing the gunshots, Newlen, on foot behind the car, shot at McDade an additional four times. Paramedics were called while McDade, prone and dying on the street, was handcuffed and searched by an officer, who found only a cellphone in McDade's front pocket. McDade was later pronounced dead at a nearby hospital at approximately 12:05 am on March 25, 2012. A medical examiner later determined that seven of the eight bullets fired by Griffin and Newlen hit McDade.

In the aftermath of McDade's death, protests and demonstrations occurred and civil rights leaders led community discussions surrounding police use of excessive force and racial profiling. Many called for greater police oversight and the establishment of a police auditor. The officers were not disciplined and returned to active duty after being cleared of criminal wrongdoing by internal review by the Pasadena Police Department and Los Angeles County district attorney's office. McDade's parents filed a civil rights lawsuit against the city of Pasadena for a wrongful death and settled out-of-court for about $1 million.

In September of 2014, an independent consulting group completed their investigation of the fatal shooting for the city of Pasadena, but the report was kept secret by a police union representing the two officers involved, citing privacy laws. After a protracted legal battle, the full report was released to the public in November 2015. The report revealed that the independent consulting group found many of the tactical decisions made by the two police officers questionable.

Death of Reginald Thomas Jr. 
On September 29, 2016, Reginald Thomas Jr., a 35-year-old Black man, died in police custody after police shocked him with a taser and wrestled with him at an apartment complex. Thomas was the father of eight children. According to Pasadena police and other officials, the police were responding to an early-morning call from Reginald Thomas, himself, who was suffering from mental challenges at the apartment.  Pasadena PD's mental treatment taskforce was not on duty to de-escalate the situation.  Rookie officers arrived and found Mr. Thomas a knife and a fire extinguisher. The physical confrontation occurred after Thomas did not obey orders to drop the objects. Six officers were involved in the calls but were not wearing any body cameras. The city of Pasadena settled a lawsuit for wrongful death and paid the family $1.5 million, but the officers did not face trial for allegations of excessive force.

Death of Matthew Jonathan Luis Hurtado 
On October 6, 2017, Matthew Johnathan Luis Hurtado, a 27-year-old Latino man, was shot and killed in a park in the city of Duarte by a multi-agency police task force involving officers from the Pasadena Police Department. Hurtado was a suspect wanted for his possible involvement in a shooting in Pasadena which wounded a 19-year-old man and 16-year old girl. The details surrounding his death are uncertain due to conflicting reports. The attorney representing Hurtado's family stated that Hurtado was inside his parked car with a friend enjoying ice cream when "police officers approached from all angles," with one police car crashing into his car. Multiple officers then proceeded to open fire on him. An investigation carried out by District Attorney Jackie Lacey's office has a different version of events, in which Hurtado began ramming one of the police vehicles after being asked to put his hands up at gunpoint, after which officers opened fire. Both Hurtado and his friend, a 36-year-old woman, were hit by gunfire and were taken to the hospital, where Hurtado was pronounced dead. Prior to the engagement, the officers involved in the task force were informed of Hurtado's violent criminal history and gang membership. The investigation deemed that the agents and officers involved in the shooting were "reasonable in their use of deadly force to prevent the escape of a dangerous, fleeing felon." In a press conference days after the events, Hurtado's family described him as a "kind-hearted, well-loved person" and father and called the events an execution.

Death of Anthony McClain 
On August 15, 2020, a 32-year-old Black man named Anthony McClain was shot and while running away from two Pasadena police officers at a routine traffic stop. Body cam and dashboard video show that McClain was shot in the back, with one wound in the lower right of his back and another to his left shoulder. Paramedics arrived at the scene within five minutes of the incident, but McClain suffered from fatal blood loss from his injuries, dying at Huntington Hospital hours later. The police officers involved claim that McClain had a handgun and that they were worried for their own safety. The officer who shot McClain did not have his body camera turned on, but the other officer's camera recorded the shooting. After repeated delays, several protests calling for better police oversight, and legal challenges, the officer who shot McClain was identified as Edwin Dumaguindin by the Pasadena police chief John Perez one month later. 

A handgun was recovered across the street from the location of the traffic stop; according to Chief Perez, a witness testified that McClain threw the pistol, which tests later revealed had McClain's DNA on it. The department released surveillance video they say shows the gun McClain threw landing in the street where it was found shortly after. Lawyers representing the McClain family dispute that McClain was carrying a gun that day. City Councilman Tyron Hampton, amongst other residents, also objected to the Pasadena Police Department's editing and narration of the released surveillance video, calling them "beyond inappropriate" due to their biased nature.  

Following the national outcry and community response to McClain's death, a Community Police Overnight Commission containing 11 seats was established as a first step towards accountability.

Arrest of Christopher Ballew 
On November 9, 2017, a 21-year-old Black man named Christopher Ballew was violently arrested by two Pasadena police officers, Zachary Lujan and Lerry Esparza. Footage from a bystander as well as police body and dashboard camera show the physical altercation occurring at a gas station during a traffic stop. Ballew suffered injuries to his left eye and shin, as well as a broken leg. Footage also shows one officer, Esparza, drawing his firearm and pointing it towards Ballew. Ballew filed a lawsuit against the Pasadena Police Department for damages sustained during the arrest and citing a violation of his civil rights. Data uncovered by Ballew's lawyer, John Burton, suggested that the Pasadena Police Department disproportionately targeted Black and Hispanic motorists during traffic stops over a 2-3 year period.

Arrest of Jasmine Richards 
On September 1, 2015, Jasmine "Abdullah" Richards, a 28-year-old Black woman and founder of Pasadena's Black Lives Matter chapter, was arrested by Pasadena police for attempting to free a person from police custody at a public demonstration. She was sentenced on June 7, 2016 to 90 days in jail and convicted of a felony lynching, a term in California penal code that refers to the illegal act of inciting a mob to remove someone from police custody. The arrest gained national attention because Richards is the first African American to be convicted of a felony lynching.

Richards suffered a non-life-threatening injury in a shooting early in the morning of January 17, 2020, in a case being classified as an attempted homicide.

Other departments

Some nearby departments rely on the Pasadena Police Department if any department lacks resources.

 Pasadena City College Police and Safety Services - Patrols property of the Pasadena Area Community College District with seven officers and 85 cadets. Officers are not armed, but have direct radio contact with the Pasadena Police Department.
 South Pasadena Police Department - Jurisdiction in the city of South Pasadena with 35 officers. PPD provides air support for the city of South Pasadena. South Pasadena used the Pasadena City Jail and the Pasadena Courthouse until 2004 when switching to the city of Alhambra jail and Alhambra Courthouse, citing high costs, and to allow the cities of Monrovia and Arcadia to use the Pasadena City Jail to house their prisoners after the old Santa Anita Judicial District Courthouse in Monrovia closed down.
 Los Angeles County Sheriff's Department - Has primary jurisdiction on Metro buses and trains running in Pasadena, the Pasadena courthouse, the unincorporated area addressed as "Pasadena, California" (including the Pasadena DMV office), Altadena, and assists the Pasadena Police Department in patrolling the Tournament of Roses Parade.

See also

 List of law enforcement agencies in California

References

External links
 Pasadena Police Department

Government of Pasadena, California
Municipal police departments of California
Organizations based in Pasadena, California
1886 establishments in California